Edith Posca (1892–1931) was a German stage and film actress. The wife of director Lupu Pick, she appeared as the leading lady in a number of his silent era productions.

Selected filmography
 City in View (1920)
 Marionettes of Desire (1920)
 The Forbidden Way (1920)
 Nobody Knows (1920)
 Nights of Terror (1921)
 Shattered (1921)
 To the Ladies' Paradise (1922)
 The House Without Laughter (1923)
 New Year's Eve (1924)

References

Bibliography
 Jennifer M. Kapczynski & Michael D. Richardson. A New History of German Cinema. Boydell & Brewer, 2014.

External links

1892 births
1931 suicides
German film actresses
1931 deaths
Suicides in Germany